Temerloh is a federal constituency in Temerloh District, Pahang, Malaysia, that has been represented in the Dewan Rakyat since 1959.

The federal constituency was created in the 1958 redistribution and is mandated to return a single member to the Dewan Rakyat under the first past the post voting system.

Demographics 
https://live.chinapress.com.my/ge15/parliament/PAHANG

History

Polling districts 
According to the federal gazette issued on 31 October 2022, the Temerloh constituency is divided into 44 polling districts.

Representation history

Note: 1Noted that in 2003 redelineation exercise this Temerloh constituency is now shifted north to Temerloh city centre from former Mentakab constituency, not Bera, Pahang in Bera District where now renamed as Bera.

State constituency

Current state assembly members

Local governments

Election results

References

Pahang federal constituencies